Drum Workshop, Inc. (also known as DW Drums or DW) is an American drum kit and hardware manufacturing company based in Oxnard, California. Current products by DW include drum sets, snare drums, and hardware.

History 
Drum Workshop was founded in 1972 as a teaching studio by Don Lombardi. Alongside student John Good, Lombardi began a small drum equipment sales operation to cover the studio's operation costs. After the closure of the Camco Drum Company in 1977, its manufacturing equipment was purchased by Drum Workshop.

After selling primarily drum hardware, the company began making its first drum sets in 1990.

Expansion and acquisition

DW expanded into larger facilities in Oxnard, California, and grew to oversee a new company, Pacific Drums and Percussion, a company offering lower-priced drum sets.

In 2015, Drum Workshop acquired Ovation Guitars, Latin Percussion, Toca Percussion, Gibraltar Hardware, and KAT Technologies. In November, 2019, DW acquired Slingerland Drum Company from Gibson, with plans to introduce Slingerland-branded, vintage style drums to the market in 2020.

In late 2022, it was announced that Roland would acquire DW for $65 million as the company looks to expand into the acoustic drum market.

References

External links

 
 Don Lombardi interview with the NAMM Oral History Program
 John Good interview with the NAMM Oral History Program

Percussion instrument manufacturing companies
Musical instrument manufacturing companies of the United States
Manufacturing companies based in California
Companies based in Oxnard, California
Manufacturing companies established in 1972
1972 establishments in California